{{DISPLAYTITLE:CHA2DS2–VASc score}}

The CHADS2 score and its updated version, the CHA2DS2-VASc score, are clinical prediction rules for estimating the risk of stroke in people with non-rheumatic atrial fibrillation (AF), a common and serious heart arrhythmia associated with thromboembolic stroke. Such a score is used to determine whether or not treatment is required with anticoagulation therapy or antiplatelet therapy, since AF can cause stasis of blood in the upper heart chambers, leading to the formation of a mural thrombus that can dislodge into the blood flow, reach the brain, cut off  supply to the brain, and cause a stroke.

A high score corresponds to a greater risk of stroke, while a low score corresponds to a lower risk of stroke. The CHADS2 score is simple and has been validated by many studies. In clinical use, the CHADS2 score (pronounced "chads two") has been superseded by the CHA2DS2-VASc score ("chads vasc"), which gives a better stratification of low-risk patients.

Use
The CHA2DS2-VASc score is a widely used medical tool used to guide physicians on blood thinning treatment to prevent stroke in people with non-valvular atrial fibrillation (AF).

CHADS2 
The CHADS2 score does not include some common stroke risk factors, and its various pros/cons have been carefully discussed. Adding together the points that correspond to the conditions that are present results in the CHADS2 score, that is used to estimate stroke risk.

CHA2DS2-VASc
To complement the CHADS2 score, by the inclusion of additional 'stroke risk modifier' risk factors, the CHA2DS2-VASc-score has been proposed.

In clinical use, the CHADS2 score has been superseded by the CHA2DS2-VASc score, which gives a better stratification of low-risk patients. The CHADS2 score has been outperformed by the CHA2DS2-VASc in multiple patient groups including patients with AF who are receiving outpatient elective electrical cardioversion.

Thus, the CHA2DS2-VASc score is a refinement of CHADS2 score and extends the latter by including additional common stroke risk factors, that is, age 65–74, female gender and vascular disease. In the CHA2DS2-VASc score, 'age 75 and above' also has extra weight, with 2 points.

The maximum CHADS2 score is 6, whilst the maximum CHA2DS2-VASc score is 9 (not 10, as might be expected from simply adding up the columns; the maximum score for age is 2 points).

Major guidelines have used the above fixed annual stroke risk as a guideline of starting anticoagulant treatment; where the ischemic stroke risk of more than 1% to 2% should be an indication to start an anticoagulant therapy. However, actual risk of getting stroke varies according to sampling method and geographical regions, as well as use of appropriate study analysis methodology. A meta-analysis of various studies in 2015 shown that annual stroke risk is less than 1% in 13 of the 17 studies for CHA2DS2-VASc score of 1, 6 out of 15 studies reported risk of 1 to 2% and 5 out of 15 studies reported risk of more than 2% for CHA2DS2-VASc score of 2. Nevertheless, stroke rates vary by study setting (hospital vs community), population (trial vs general), ethnicity, etc.  Some studies included in the metaanalysis include females with score 1 by virtue of gender (who are low risk), into the aggregate rates; others included do not account for followup anticoagulation use (thus lowering rates) and were analysed by excluding all patients ever started on anticoagulants ('conditioning on the future' error).

The CHA2DS2-VASc Score has shown increasing popularity over time while the CHADS2 has shown decreasing popularity, which could "partly be related to introduction of guidelines recommending the use of the CHA2DS2-VASc score for stroke risk stratification". The predictive abilities of risk scores for ischemic stroke in patients with kidney function impairment is questionable: a large head-to-head external validation study demonstrated poor discrimination and calibration in patients with reduced kidney function.

Treatment recommendations
The CHA2DS2-VASc score has been used in the 2012 and subsequent European Society of Cardiology guidelines for the management of atrial fibrillation. The 2014 American College of Cardiology/American Heart Association Task Force on Practice Guidelines and the Heart Rhythm Society guidelines also recommend use of the CHA2DS2-VASc score.

The European Society of Cardiology (ESC), and National Institute for Health and Care Excellence (NICE) guidelines recommend that if the patient has a CHA2DS2-VASc score of 2 and above, oral anticoagulation therapy (OAC) with a vitamin K antagonist (VKA, e.g. warfarin with target INR of 2-3) or one of the direct oral anticoagulant drugs (DOACs, e.g. dabigatran, rivaroxaban, edoxaban, or apixaban) is recommended.

If the patient is 'low risk' using the CHA2DS2-VASc score (that is, 0 in males or 1 in females), no anticoagulant therapy is recommended.

In males with 1 stroke risk factor (that is, a CHA2DS2-VASc score=1), antithrombotic therapy with OAC may be considered, and people's values and preferences should be considered. Even a single stroke risk factor confers excess risk of stroke and mortality, with a positive net clinical benefit for stroke prevention with oral anticoagulation, when compared to no treatment or aspirin. As mentioned above, thromboembolic event rates differ according to various guideline treatment thresholds and methodological approaches.

Anticoagulation
Treatment recommendations based on the CHA2DS2-VASc score are shown in the following table:

Based on the ESC guidelines on AF, oral anticoagulation is recommended or preferred for people with one or more stroke risk factors (i.e. a CHA2DS2-VASc score of ≥1 in males, or ≥2 in females).  This is consistent with a recent decision analysis model showing how the 'tipping point' on the decision to anticoagulate has changed with the availability of the 'safer' DOAC drugs, where the threshold for offering stroke prevention (i.e. oral anticoagulation) is a stroke rate of approximately 1%/year.

Those patients recommended for stroke prevention treatment via oral anticoagulation, choice of drug (i.e. between a vitamin K antagonist and direct oral anticoagulant (DOAC)) can be evaluated using the SAMe-TT2R2 score to help decision-making on the most appropriate oral anticoagulant.

Bleeding risk

Stroke risk assessment should always include an assessment of bleeding risk.  This can be done using validated bleeding risk scores, such as the HEMORR2HAGES or HAS-BLED scores.  The HAS-BLED score is recommended in guidelines, to identify the high risk patient for regular review and followup and to address the reversible risk factors for bleeding (e.g. uncontrolled hypertension, labile INRS, excess alcohol use or concomitant aspirin/NSAID use).  If the patient is taking warfarin, then knowledge of INR control is needed to assess the 'labile INR' criterion in HAS-BLED; otherwise for a non-warfarin patient, this criterion scores zero.  A high HAS-BLED score is not a reason to withhold anticoagulation.  Also, when compared to HAS-BLED, other bleeding risk scores that did not consider 'labile INR' would significantly underperform in predicting bleeding on warfarin, and would often inappropriately categorise many patients who sustained bleeds as 'low risk'.

History
The CHA2DS2-VASc score expanded from the CHADS2 score, first published in 2001.

References

External links
Dosing information given CHADS2 Score
Online calculator of the CHA2DS2-VASc score

Diagnostic cardiology
Stroke
Medical scoring system
Medical mnemonics